The 1908 Ashburton by-election was a by-election held in England on 17 January 1908 to elect a new Member of Parliament (MP) for the British House of Commons constituency of Ashburton in Devon.

Vacancy
The by-election was triggered by the appointment of the sitting Liberal MP Harry Trelawney Eve as a judge.

History

Candidates
The Liberal Unionist candidate Ernest Morrison-Bell, had lost the constituency by 1,283 votes in the previous general election.

Campaign
The Liberal government had introduced the Small Holdings and Allotments Act of 1907 which sought to limit the degree to which fixtures and improvements remained the property of landlords, and to increase the number of small farmers. This new measure was expected to have a strong appeal to voters in rural constituencies like Ashburton.

Result
The result was a victory for the Liberal Unionist candidate Ernest Morrison-Bell. 

The loss of the seat came as a surprise to the Liberals, who had expected to retain it. The unsuccessful Liberal Candidate, Charles Roden Buxton, complained that the Liberal government had wrongly been blamed for the increased price of food; Morrison-Bell assured his followers that it had been a great victory for the cause of tariff reform. A crowd of over 10,000 people gathered in the town centre to hear the result, and after it was announced, several fights broke out, with Liberal supporters accusing their opponents of having won through 'beer' and 'bribery'. Morrison-Bell had to be escorted to the Conservative Club by the police, and Emmeline Pankhurst and another supporter of the women's suffrage movement were knocked down and injured in a shop in which they had taken refuge. A crowd later invaded the Conservative Club, causing considerable damage, and the police had to charge with truncheons, leaving several people in need of medical treatment. A number of policemen were injured by stones and one was hospitalised.

Aftermath

References

See also 
 List of United Kingdom by-elections
 Ashburton constituency
1904 Ashburton by-election

By-elections to the Parliament of the United Kingdom in Devon constituencies
1908 in England
1908 elections in the United Kingdom
Teignbridge
January 1908 events
1910s in Devon